Obra is a 2008 Philippine television drama anthology broadcast by GMA Network. Starring Katrina Halili, JC de Vera, Sunshine Dizon and Iza Calzado, it premiered on August 14, 2008. The show concluded on November 27, 2008, with a total of 16 episodes.

The show is streaming online on YouTube.

Episodes

Accolades

References

External links
 
 

2008 Philippine television series debuts
2008 Philippine television series endings
Filipino-language television shows
GMA Network original programming
Philippine anthology television series